Harry Arnall-Thompson (7 April 1864 – 28 December 1916) was an English cricketer. He played six first-class matches for Oxford University Cricket Club, Marylebone Cricket Club, and the Gentlemen of England between 1885 and 1887.  He was born Harry Thompson Arnall and changed his name to Harry Thompson Arnall-Thompson in December 1885. He was educated at Rugby School and Brasenose College, Oxford.

See also
 List of Oxford University Cricket Club players

References

External links
 

1864 births
1916 deaths
English cricketers
Oxford University cricketers
Cricketers from Leicester
People educated at Rugby School
Alumni of Brasenose College, Oxford
Gentlemen of England cricketers
Marylebone Cricket Club cricketers